Arnold Alexander Webster (9 March 1899 – 27 July 1979) was a Canadian politician and served as Leader of the Opposition and leader of the BC Co-operative Commonwealth Federation (now known as the British Columbia NDP). He returned to politics as a Member of Parliament for the federal New Democratic Party in the 1960s.

Biography
Webster was born in Vancouver and raised in Agassiz, B.C. After obtaining a Master of Arts from the University of British Columbia and a Bachelor of Pedagogy at the University of Toronto he became a teacher and later a principal in Vancouver.

Webster joined the CCF in 1932 and became president of the British Columbia section of the party. He ran for a seat in the House of Commons of Canada on behalf of the CCF in 1935, 1940, 1945 and 1949 but was unsuccessful. In 1953, he was elected leader of the BC CCF succeeding Harold Winch and was elected Member of the Legislative Assembly for Vancouver East in the 1953 general election becoming Leader of the Opposition. He left politics in 1956 but returned in the 1962 federal election to run for the New Democratic Party and was elected to the House of Commons of Canada from Vancouver Kingsway. He was re-elected in 1963 but did not run again in the 1965 federal election.

During his term as Leader of the Opposition in British Columbia, Webster urged the adoption of a provincial bill of rights. In his political career he also opposed the testing and stockpiling of nuclear weapons.

In 1955, Webster married Daisy de Jong who went on to serve in the British Columbia assembly.

References

1899 births
1979 deaths
British Columbia Co-operative Commonwealth Federation MLAs
20th-century Canadian politicians
Leaders of the British Columbia CCF/NDP
Members of the House of Commons of Canada from British Columbia
New Democratic Party MPs
Politicians from Vancouver